Nabu is the Assyrian and Babylonian god of wisdom and writing.

Nabu may also refer to:

Places
Nabu, the ancient Babylonian name for the planet Mercury

Art, entertainment, and media
an alias of DC Comics character Doctor Fate
Nabu Press, an imprint of the historical reprints publisher BiblioLife
Nabu, a recurring character from the Italian TV series Winx Club

Other uses
NABU Network, an obsolete microcomputer system
Nabu Network Corp., developer of 1984 MSX game Heli-Tank
Naturschutzbund Deutschland, the German Nature Conservation Society
National Anti-Corruption Bureau of Ukraine, a Ukrainian anti-corruption law enforcement agency

See also
Nabo (disambiguation)
Naboo, a planet in the Star Wars universe
Naboo the Enigma, a character in The Mighty Boosh